The Srimad Bhagavata is one of the main books of Hindu philosophy. The Bhagavata is a devotional account of the Supreme Being and His incarnations. The second book of the Srimad Bhagavata covers the creation of the universe according to Hindu Mythology and gives a summary of the Bhagavata. This book consists of 10 chapters. The Bhagavata is authored by Veda Vyasa and the source material for this summary is the translation presented by Swami Tapasyananda. Additional material and analysis is included. 

For the events leading up to this point, see Srimad Bhagavata Book 1.

Chapter 1
	Suka Rishi is very happy to hear Parikshit's question, as its answer will benefit mankind.
	Suka Rishi tells Parikshit that even though he was already completely established in the formless, infinite Atman, his mind was still attracted to Narayana’s playful acts in His incarnations.
	This is an example of the power of Bhakti (devotion) to Narayana even over knowledge of the Atman.
	Whoever hears the Bhagavata with faith will through Bhakti reach the highest state. 
	Sri Suka explains to Parikshit the True purpose of life
	Life is for the attainment of the Spiritual Goal (not only material goals)
	Life is very short and should not be wasted 
	Importance of meditation and renunciation in order to purify the mind.
	Beauty of the Bhagavata and story of Vishnu and His playful acts.
	This will lead to love of Vishnu.
	At least think of renunciation when Death is approaching.
	Meditate on the cosmic form (Viratpurusha)
	Description of the cosmic form, each part represents something abstract.
	For example, the Vedas are the top of Vishnu's head, and the wind is Vishnu's breath.
	All the worlds are parts of Vishnu's body.

Chapter 2
	Importance of renunciation
	Meditate on the form of Narayana in the space within the heart
	This form is similar to Vishnu's 4-armed form with the lotus, discus, mace, and conch
	One should meditate on the whole form until the mind is steady
	One should then meditate on each part of the Lord individually starting with the feet and going up to the face 
	If an individual cannot do this, he/she can meditate on the entire universe as a form of the Lord (Viratrupa)
	Gross substances are made of subtler substances
	This idea is one of the fundamental axioms of Hindu philosophy. 
	For example, jewelry (a gross substance) is made of gold (a subtler substance)
	One should raise the energy from the lower Chakra (Muladhara) all the way to the highest one (Brahmarandhra).
	The idea of renunciation is to merge the gross senses/elements/organs into their subtler versions one by one until that (the Mahattattva, or great element) is merged in Prakriti. At this point the Jiva (individual) is one with Brahman, the Supreme.

Chapter 3
	People who want a specific object or status should worship a specific deity.
	Worshipping Brahma gives Vedic learning and powers
	Worshipping Sri (Lakshmi) gives wealth
	However, all the deities get their powers from the Supreme.
	By worshipping the Supreme, one gets all their material and spiritual desires fulfilled.
	The True purpose of life is to worship the Supreme and develop Bhakti (devotion).

Chapter 4
	Parikshit asks Suka Rishi numerous questions about the Supreme, his power Maya (the power of illusion), and the knowledge of the Atman (soul)
	Suka Rishi's praises of the Supreme
	Director of the creation, preservation, and dissolution of the universe
	One who gives all rewards (including liberation) and punishments
	Thinking of and worshipping the Supreme destroys all sins
	Having numerous self-willed incarnations for the good of all
	The creator of the Vedas
	Creates and lives in the bodies of all

Chapter 5
	Narada believes that Brahma created the universe and praises Brahma as the Supreme, but wonders then why Brahma had to do great austerities
	Brahma takes the opportunity to praise Vasudeva, the true creator of the universe, as the one even above Brahma
	Brahma describes the creation of the universe:
	Vishnu created Maya (the agent that causes people to associate the world of objects with themselves)
	Vishnu is Himself unaffected by Maya
	The existence of Maya led to the creation of matter, Kala (Time), Karma (the effects of actions on the future), Swabhava (Nature), and the Jiva (individual soul)
	Everything is an aspect of Narayana
	Even though the Iswara (Narayana) and Jiva (individual) are part of the same Atman (all-pervading spirit and life-force), Iswara knows the Truth about this and is free, while the Jiva thinks himself to be mortal, and is bound
	This idea is one of the key ideas of the philosophy taught in the Bhagavata.
	This led to the creation of Mahattattva, which led to the creation of the subsequent categories.
	The first of the categories is the 3 Gunas (or modes of nature). They are Sattva (good), Rajas (average), and Tamas (bad).
	Ahankara (the ego) is mostly Tamas
	The elements were evolved from Tamas in the following order
	Space (with the property of Sound) 
	Wind (with the property of Touch) 
	Fire (with the property of Sight)
	Water (with the property of Taste)
	Earth (with the property of Smell)
	This ordering describes how the gross elements evolved from the subtle elements.
	The Manas (mind) was born out of the Sattva aspect of Ahankara
	The Buddhi (intellect) and Prana (life-breath) were born out of the Rajas aspect of Ahankara
	From these come the sense organs and organs of action
	The universe was created, but existed in an inert state.
	Narayana entered into the universe, and gave it life
	All the worlds are part of Narayana's universal form.

Chapter 6 
	Brahma continues explaining about Narayana's Universal Form to Narada
	The Purusha is Narayana's Universal Form, which is described in Purusha Sukta
	Each part of the Purusha is the original and complete prototype and contains all the related senses and objects.
	An infinitesimal part is found in the human body.
	The Supreme is unaffected by all creation, and is in the ultimate state of Sat-Chit-Ananda (existence-knowledge-bliss).
	Worldly life is restricted to the 3 worlds of Bhu (earth), Bhava (the intermediate regions), and Svah (Heaven)
	There are 4 regions higher than this – these are achieved by the paths of knowledge and God-dedicated correct action
	Vidya (knowledge of the Supreme) and Avidya (ignorance of the Spiritual Truth)
	Vidya leads to Moksha
	Avidya leads to being bound in the cycle of Samsara (worldly life)
	All Yajna is an offering of the Purusha to the Purusha done by the Purusha
	The individual performing the Yajna, the materials involved, and the goal of the Yajna are all Purusha!
	The Supreme directs Brahma to create the world

Chapter 7 
	Summary of the Narayana's Incarnations and glories told by Brahma to Narada Muni:
	Cosmic Boar – to rescue the Earth
	Suyajna – removes the sufferings of all. For this, He is called Hari (the remover of sufferings).
	Kapila Muni – to give the Supreme Knowledge (Sankyha philosophy)
	Dattatreya – the son of Rishi Atri and Anasuya
	Sanaka, Sanandana, Sanatana, Sanatakumara – 4 sons of Brahma who are among the greatest of sages
	Nara and Narayana – 2 great sages 
	Narayana came to help Dhruva after his prayers
	Prithu – a very good king who brought out multiple resources from the earth
	Rishaba – a very great sage
Hayagriva – with the neck of a horse
	Cosmic Fish – saved the earth during the deluge
	Divine Tortoise – during the churning of the ocean
	Man-lion – to help Prahlada and destroy Hiranyakasipu
	To save the lordly elephant (Gajendra)
Vamana – to win back the worlds from Mahabali and give it to Indra
	Vishnu incarnates in each Manvantra to protect the Manu
	Dhanvantari – cures men from diseases by the power of His name
Parasurama – destroyed the rulers as they had become corrupt
	Sri Rama – to destroy Ravana and teach the worlds about righteous living
	Narayana's incarnation as Krishna is given special emphasis 
	Summary of Krishna's deeds, especially His charming playful childhood mischief
	Narayana's future incarnations
	Narayana's powers, glories, and incarnations are infinite
	Bhramaji concludes that whoever recites and/or hears about these incarnations of the Lord with faith and devotion, and enjoys thinking about the Lord's actions, will be free from Maya and eventually reach the Highest State

Chapter 8 
	Narayana quickly enters the heart of one who thinks of His glories constantly.
	This completely purifies the devotee.
	Parikshit asks Sri Suka 20 questions whose answers form the Bhagavata:
	Nature of the Atman
	Difference between man and God
	Creation
	The result of actions
	Incarnations
	Duties
	Rituals

Chapter 9 
Maya (Narayana's illusory power) causes the Jiva to identify itself with the body
	Brahma is unsure how to proceed with creation and hears Tapa, Tapa (Meditate! Meditate!)
	Brahma meditates for many divine years and Vishnu appears
	Brahma sees Vishnu's Realm (Vaikuntha) where all beings have Vishnu's wonderful 4-armed form
	Vaikuntha is beyond constraints of worldly life (such as Time)
	Sri Devi lives in Vaikuntha constantly praising Vishnu
	Tapas (Meditation) is the core of Vishnu's being
	Everything is Vishnu
	Brahma asks Vishnu for the knowledge of His powers and the creation of the universe
	Brahma wants to understand how to proceed with the creation of the Universe (Brahma's duty) without having pride/attachment in his position and accomplishments
	Vishnu teaches Brahma the Supreme Knowledge
	Only the Supreme exists before creation and after dissolution
	Maya is a reflection superimposed on the Atman without any reality of its own, which does not change the Atman in any way
	The elements combine into things but still keep their pure forms
	The Supreme creates the beings but is not bound by them in any way
	The Supreme Spirit creates and persists through everything, but is not affected by them and their destruction
	The knowledge given in the Bhagavata comes from Narayana, who taught It to Brahma, who taught It to Narada (his son), who taught It to Maharishi Veda Vyasa, who taught It to Suka Rishi

Chapter 10
	The Viratpurusha (Cosmic Person) created the Cosmic Waters in order to have a place to exist.
	Therefore, the Viratpurusha is known as Narayana, the one who rests in the water.
	Description of the Gross Cosmic Form of Narayana
	Every part of the Cosmic Form was formed with 4 entities:
	The place (such as the mouth)
	The organ (such as the tongue)
	The sense object (such as taste)
	The Deity (such as Varuna)
	The first part to develop was the mouth, in order to satisfy hunger
	Suka Rishi describes the creation of the categories in the creative cycle (Kalpa)
	More details will be given in the next book of the Bhagavata.

For the continuation of the Bhagavata, see Srimad Bhagavata Book 3.

References

Krishna
Puranas
Hindu texts
Vaishnava texts